Donn Eric Rosen (1929-1986) was a member of the staff of the American Museum of Natural History. He was a Distinguished Fellow of the American Society of Ichthyologists and Herpetologists.

Family
Born to immigrants Irwin Rosen (b. 1885) and Anita Gerber Rosen (b. 1906), Rosen has an older brother : Charles Welles. Both his parents were born in Russia. Irwin came to the United States in 1889 and had a career in architecture. Anita arrived in the United States prior to 1920.

Works
Rosen has written over twenty eight scientific papers.

Rosen has described twenty three species.

Selected publications
Rosen, Donn Eric, P. Humphry Greenwood 1970. Origin of the Weberian Apparatus and the Relationships of the Ostariophysan and Gonorynchiform Fishes, American Museum Novitates, American Museum of Natural History,New York, New York, USA, 2428

Rosen, Donn Eric, Bailey, Reeve M. The Poeciliid Fishes (Cyprinodontiformes), Their Structure, Zoogeography, and Systematics. Bulletin of the American Museum of Natural History. 1963. 126(1) p59

Cohen, Daniel M.; Ebeling, Alfred W.; Iwamoto, Tomio; McDowell, Samuel B.; Marshall, N. B.; Rosen, Donn E.; Sonoda, Pearl; III, Walter H. Weed; Woods, Loren P. (October 23, 2018). Orders Heteromi (Notacanthiformes), Berycomorphi (Beryciformes), Xenoberyces (Stephanoberyciformes), Anacanthini (Gadiformes): Part 6. Yale University Press. ISBN 9781933789293 – via Google Books.

Rosen, Donn Eric (1973), "Interrelationships of higher euteleostean fishes", in Greenwood, P.H.; Miles, R.S.; Patterson, Colin (eds.), Interrelationships of Fishes, Academic Press, pp. 397–513, ISBN 0-12-300850-6

LEON CROIZAT,' GARETH NELSON AND DONN ERIC ROSEN, CENTERS OF ORIGIN and RELATED CONCEPTS, Systematic Zoology, Vol. 23, No. 2 (Jun., 1974), pp. 265-287

Legacy

Species named after Rosen
The Ricefish Adrianichthys roseni Parenti & Soeroto, 2004.  (Adrianichthyidae)
Brachyrhaphis roseni W. A. Bussing, 1988, (Poeciliidae)
Curimata roseni Vari, 1984 (Curimatidae)
The eel Meadia roseni H. K. Mok, C. Y. Lee & H. J. Chan, 1991 is named after him.(Synaphobranchidae)
Rakthamichthys roseni (R. M. Bailey & Gans, 1998) (Synbranchidae)
Sternarchorhynchus roseni Mago-Leccia, 1994 (Rosen's tube-snouted ghost knifefish) (Apteronotidae)
Xiphophorus roseni M. K. Meyer & Wischnath, 1981 (Poeciliidae)

See also

:Category:Taxa named by Donn Eric Rosen

References 

American ichthyologists
1929 births
1986 deaths